Wernya karsholti is a moth in the family Drepanidae. It was described by Gyula M. László, Gábor Ronkay and László Aladár Ronkay in 2001. It is found in Thailand.

References

Moths described in 2001
Thyatirinae
Moths of Asia